Irina Nikolayevna Alexeeva or Alekseeva (born 20 April 2002) is a Russian artistic gymnast and a former member of the Russian National Team. She was part of the teams that won the gold medal at the 2018 European Championships and the silver medal at the 2018 World Championships.

Early life 
Alexeeva was born in Moscow, Russia, and began her gymnastics there training under Dina Kamalova, the same coach as eventual Olympic champion Aliya Mustafina. She has an elder brother, Andrey. In 2010, Alexeeva moved to the United States when she was 7 following Kamalova's departure, and resumed training under her at the World Olympic Gymnastics Academy, the same gym where Olympic champions Carly Patterson and Nastia Liukin trained and where eventual Olympic champion Madison Kocian was currently training.

Gymnastics career

Junior

2016–2017 
Alexeeva qualified as a junior elite gymnast in 2016, making her elite debut at the American Classic that May. She finished third in the all-around and on uneven bars, winning one gold on balance beam.  In June, she competed at the U.S. Classic, placing first in both the junior all-around competition and the balance beam. However, she was ineligible to compete at the 2016 U.S. National Gymnastics Championships in St. Louis, Missouri as she was not an American citizen.

Alexeeva spent the 2017 season recovering from an injury.

Senior

2018 
In her first year as a Senior gymnast, Alexeeva competed at International Gymnix in Canada, where she won the bronze medal in the All-Around and the gold medal on floor exercise and uneven bars. After being unable to obtain American citizenship, Alexeeva competed at the Russian National Championships in April in hopes of making the Russian National Team. There she placed 7th in the All-Around after falling off the balance beam. She also placed second on uneven bars, behind Angelina Melnikova and ahead of 2011 and 2015 World Champion Viktoria Komova, and third on floor exercise, behind Melnikova and Angelina Simakova. In May, Alexeeva was officially added to the Russian National Team, replacing Natalia Kapitonova. She later returned to Moscow and began training at Round Lake.

In June, she received her FIG license, enabling her to officially represent Russia in international competitions. Later that month, Alexeeva was slated to compete at the Russian Cup but had to pull out due to a knee injury.

On 20 July, Alexeeva was named to the Russian team to compete at the 2018 European Championships alongside Melnikova, Simakova, Lilia Akhaimova, and Uliana Perebinosova. Alexeeva only competed on uneven bars and balance beam in the qualification. She scored high enough to qualify to the Uneven Bars Finals but did not qualify due to her teammates Melnikova and Perebinosova scoring higher. She once again competed on uneven bars and balance beam in the Team Finals where Russia won the gold medal.

On 29 September, Alexeeva was named on the nominative team roster to compete at the 2018 World Championships in Doha, Qatar alongside Akhaimova, Melnikova, Aliya Mustafina, and Simakova. On 17 October, the World team was officially announced and was unchanged from the nominative team.  During qualifications Alexeeva competed on all four events. She qualified to the All-Around in 12th and Russia qualified to the Team Final in second place.  During the team final Alexeeva competed on vault, uneven bars, and balance beam, helping Russia win the silver medal. In the All-Around Final she finished 13th.

2019 
Despite being named to the national team for 2019, Valentina Rodionenko confirmed that Alexeeva had left the national team in order to focus on NCAA gymnastics in the United States.  While Alexeeva had not announced any commitments, she had an official visit to Stanford University the previous fall, sparking rumors that she'd join their gymnastics team.

On September 20, Alexeeva announced on Instagram that she will be attending Stanford University and competing on their gymnastics team, starting in the 2020–2021 school year.  She will be the first Russian national WAG team member to compete in NCAA gymnastics.  In November she signed her National Letter of Intent with the Stanford Cardinal gymnastics team.

Level 10

2020 
In February Alexeeva competed at the WOGA Classic as a Level 10 competitor.  She only competed on uneven bars and balance beam where she recorded the second highest score on each in her session.

NCAA

2020–2021 season 
Alexeeva redshirted the season due to having 90 bone chips removed from her hip.

2021–2022 season 
Alexeeva made her collegiate debut in 2022.  She competed in four meets before stopping to focus on her continued recovery.

2022–2023 season 
Alexeeva returned to competition on January 6, 2023 at the Super 16 Invitational where she only competed on uneven bars.  The following week she competed in a dual meet against San Jose where she made her collegiate debut on balance beam.  She earned scores of 9.875 (uneven bars) and 9.85 (balance beam) towards Stanford's victory.  She was named Pac-12 Coaches Choice of the Week.

Competitive history

International Scores

References

External links
 

2002 births
Living people
Russian female artistic gymnasts
People from Plano, Texas
World Olympic Gymnastics Academy
Gymnasts from Moscow
Sportspeople from Plano, Texas
Russian expatriates in the United States
Gymnasts from Texas
European champions in gymnastics
Medalists at the World Artistic Gymnastics Championships
Stanford Cardinal women's gymnasts
21st-century Russian women